Audrius Raizgys (born 4 April 1969) is a retired male triple jumper from Lithuania. His personal best jump is 17.29 metres, achieved in July 1995 in Vilnius. This is the current Lithuanian record.

He finished eighth at the 1994 European Athletics Championships in Helsinki with a jump of 16.59 metres. In addition he competed at the World Championships in 1993, 1995, 1997 and 1999, the World Indoor Championships in 1993 and 1995 and the 1996 Summer Olympics without reaching the finals there.

International competitions

References

External links

1969 births
Living people
Lithuanian male triple jumpers
Olympic male triple jumpers
Olympic athletes of Lithuania
Athletes (track and field) at the 1996 Summer Olympics
World Athletics Championships athletes for Lithuania
Russian Athletics Championships winners